St. Konrad (or Sankt Konrad) is a town in the Gmunden district in the Austrian state of Upper Austria in Austria.

Geography
Sankt Konrad is part of the Salzkammergut resort area in Austria. It lies between the Traunsee and the Alm valley. About 51 percent of the municipality is forest, and 44 percent is farmland.

References 

Cities and towns in Gmunden District